Cochamal District is one of twelve districts of the province Rodríguez de Mendoza in the country of Peru.

References

Districts of the Rodríguez de Mendoza Province
Districts of the Amazonas Region